Parabybe subfoveolata is a species of beetle in the family Cerambycidae, and the only species in the genus Parabybe. It was described by Schwarzer in 1930.

References

Apomecynini
Beetles described in 1930
Monotypic beetle genera